The Saville Community Sports Centre is a sports facility run by the University of Alberta's Faculty of Physical Education and Recreation, where it is located in Edmonton, Alberta. It features a curling rink, tennis courts and a gymnasium.

Opened in 2003, the centre currently serves as the national training centre for curling in Canada. Its curling facilities include ten sheets, and is home to a membership of nearly 2000 curlers, making it the curling club with the largest membership list in the world.

The club is home to many of the top curling teams in the world, including Olympic gold medallist Kevin Martin, Brier champion Kevin Koe, Randy Ferbey, Ted Appelman, Chris Schille, Cathy King, Heather Nedohin and Val Sweeting.

A West Wing, added in 2011, is Canada's largest hardwood installation, and the home of the University of Alberta Golden Bears and Pandas basketball and volleyball teams.

Saville hosted the 2015 FIBA Americas Women's Championship.

The centre is also home to eight indoor tennis courts and nine outdoor courts, a fitness centre, a 9000 sq. ft. gym, and "Kevin's Rocks-N-Racquets" Pro Shop, run by Kevin Martin himself.

The Saville Community Sports Centre was named for Bruce Saville, a businessman and philanthropist in Edmonton.

References

External links
Saville Sports Centre

Curling clubs in Canada
Sports venues completed in 2003
Sport at the University of Alberta
Sports venues in Edmonton
2003 establishments in Alberta
University sports venues in Canada